Bishop Wilton is a small village and civil parish in the East Riding of Yorkshire, England.

The civil parish is formed by the village of Bishop Wilton and the hamlets of Gowthorpe and Youlthorpe.
According to the 2011 UK census, Bishop Wilton parish had a population of 554 in 227 households, an increase on the 2001 UK census figure of 500 in 199 households. Just north of the village lies Bishop Wilton Wold, more commonly referred to as Garrowby Hill.

Through the centre of Bishop Wilton runs a shallow beck, flanked on both sides by open grass verges.

The village has a local shop, a small primary school, an art gallery with screen printing workshop, and the Fleece Inn public house.

St Edith's, the medieval Church of England parish church, is dedicated to Edith of Wilton. The church was restored in 1858–59 with internal embellishment to designs by J. L. Pearson. It was designated a Grade I listed building in January 1967 and is now recorded in the National Heritage List for England, maintained by Historic England. The church is on the Sykes Churches Trail devised by the East Yorkshire Churches Group.
Around the village there are walks on the Wolds with views across the Vale of York.

References

External links

 
 Village web site
 The Fleece Inn
 Annual Bishop Wilton Show & Craft fair
 More photos of Bishop Wilton

Villages in the East Riding of Yorkshire
Civil parishes in the East Riding of Yorkshire